Maritza Figueroa (born 8 March 1976) is a Nicaraguan sprinter. She competed in the women's 400 metres at the 2000 Summer Olympics.

References

External links
 

1976 births
Living people
Athletes (track and field) at the 2000 Summer Olympics
Nicaraguan female sprinters
Olympic athletes of Nicaragua
Place of birth missing (living people)
Central American Games bronze medalists for Nicaragua
Central American Games medalists in athletics
Olympic female sprinters